Patric Thomas Dickinson (26 December 1914 – 28 January 1994) was a British poet, translator from the Greek and Latin classics, and playwright. He also worked for the BBC, from 1942 to 1948. His verse play Theseus and the Minotaur was broadcast by the BBC in July 1945 and published by Jonathan Cape the following year, along with a selection of his poems. He wrote full-time from 1948 and edited (with Sheila Shannon) Personal Portraits, a series of short biographies published by Max Parrish Ltd. and Adprint, London.

He was born in Nasirabad, India. He studied at St. Catharine's College, Cambridge. An autobiography The Good Minute was published in 1965.

He received the Cholmondeley Award in 1973.

Poetry books published include the following, all in the Phoenix Living Poets series:
The World I See (1960)
This Cold Universe (1964)
More than Time (1970)
A Wintering Tree (1973)
The Bearing Beast (1976)
Our Living John (1979)
A Rift in Time (1982)

Archives 
Papers of Patric Dickinson are held at the Cadbury Research Library, University of Birmingham.

References

External links
Patric Dickinson Papers at the Harry Ransom Center
Biography

1914 births
1994 deaths
Alumni of St Catharine's College, Cambridge
20th-century British poets
British male poets
20th-century British male writers
20th-century British writers